Type 917 torpedo retriever (TR/TWR) / range support vessel / target ship (AGT ) is a type of little known auxiliary ship built in the People's Republic of China (PRC) for the People's Liberation Army Navy (PLAN). As a successor of earlier Type 803 torpedo retriever, Type 917 TR/TWR/AGT has received NATO reporting name Damen class, or 大门 in Chinese, meaning  "big gate". As with its predecessors, once these have retired from their original torpedo retrieving duties, they are converted to range support vessels/target ships, until finally sunk as targets. Specification:
Length: (m): 63.68
Beam (m): 9
Draft (m): 2.8
Standard displacement (t): 720
Full displacement (t): 742.5
Speed (kt): 13
Propulsion: 8300CZ marine diesels @ 1100 hp x 2
Type 917 AGT/TWR/TR in PLAN service is designated by a combination of two Chinese characters followed by a three-digit number. The second Chinese character is Yun (运), meaning "transport" in Chinese, indicating that in addition to range support and targeting missions, this class is also used as transports (AP), though some modification work is required to remove onboard range support and targeting equipment before it can be used to transport cargoes. The first Chinese character denotes which fleet the ship is service with, with East (Dong, 东) for East Sea Fleet, North (Bei, 北) for North Sea Fleet, and South (Nan, 南) for South Sea Fleet. However, the pennant numbers are subject to change due to changes of Chinese naval ships naming convention, or when units are transferred to different fleets. As of 2022, a total of nine ships have been identified:

References

Auxiliary ships of the People's Liberation Army Navy
Ships of the People's Liberation Army Navy